The following lists events that happened during 1980 in Libya.

Incumbents
 Prime Minister: Jadallah Azzuz at-Talhi

Events

April
 April 15 - Libya recognizes the Sahrawi Arab Democratic Republic.

References

 
1980s in Libya
Years of the 20th century in Libya
Libya
Libya